The Cacophony Society  is an American organization described on their website as "a randomly gathered network of free spirits united in the pursuit of experiences beyond the pale of mainstream society."  It was started in 1986 by surviving members of the now defunct Suicide Club of San Francisco.

Cacophony has been described as an indirect culture jamming outgrowth of the Dada movement. One of its central concepts is the Trip to the Zone, or Zone Trip, inspired by the 1979 Film Stalker by Andrei Tarkovsky.

According to self-designated members of the Society, "you may already be a member." The anarchic nature of the Society means that membership is left open-ended and anyone may sponsor an event, though not every idea pitched garners attendance by members.  Cacophony events often involve costumes and pranks in public places and sometimes going into places that are generally off limits to the public. Cacophonists have been known to regale Christmas shoppers with improvised Christmas carols while dressed as Santa Claus.

San Francisco chapter
Members of the Cacophony Society's first group also became the primary organizers of the annual Burning Man event after Cacophony member Michael Mikel attended its previous incarnation as an as-yet-unnamed beach party at Baker Beach in 1988 and publicized the 1989 event in the Cacophony Society newsletter. Cacophonist Kevin Evans conceived of Zone Trip #4 in 1990 and organized it with John Law and Michael Mikel, publicizing it in the newsletter as "A Bad Day at Black Rock". Larry Harvey and Jerry James were subsequently invited to bring their effigy along, after they were prevented from burning it on the beach by law enforcement. Other events created by the Society are: the Atomic Cafe, the Chinese New Year's Treasure Hunt, the picnic on the Golden Gate Bridge, driving an earthquake-damaged car on the closed Embarcadero Freeway to commemorate the 1989 Loma Prieta earthquake,
the Brides of March, Urban Iditarod, and the Sewer Walk.  After a lull in activity in the San Francisco branch of the society in the late 1990s and the cessation of publication of that chapter's monthly newsletter Rough Draft listing of events for the San Francisco Cacophony Society (172 issues were produced during the years 1986 to 2001), a group of subscribers to the practically defunct society's email discussion list became active under the Cacophony Society aegis following a mock Pigeon Roast put on by a fictitious organization calling itself "Bay Area Rotisserie Friends" in San Francisco's Union Square in 2000 proposed by Drunken Consumptive Panda.  This new group of Cacophonists is occasionally referred to by its members as Cacophony 2.0 and emphasize their chaotic, ebullient spirit with the motto "If you don't live it, it won't come out your [bull]horn." The Society's newsletter was briefly revived under the name 2econd Draft.

In 2013 Kevin Evans, Carrie Galbraith and John Law co-authored "Tales of the San Francisco Cacophony Society", a book published by Last Gasp.

In 2013 a digitized collection of The San Francisco Cacophony Society's Rough Draft newsletters was uploaded to the Internet Archive.

Los Angeles chapter
The Los Angeles chapter, started in April, 1991, listed events in their monthly newsletter, "Tales from the Zone."  After several years of mailing out monthly newsletters, they switched to an on-line newsletter format.  The events produced by the Los Angeles branch often pushed the boundaries of pranksterism with several historic events, including "Cement Cuddlers," an event where they filled a dozen teddy bears with cement and put them on toy store shelves, complete with bar-coded labels; "Pet Cemetery Bingo"; "The Crucifixion of the Easter Bunny"; and "Klowns against Commerce," which tested the limits to which a clown could abuse businessmen in downtown Los Angeles before being assaulted or arrested.

The Los Angeles group splintered in late 2000 when longtime leader Reverend Al pranked the society itself and declared a "bold new direction" for the branch and allegedly joined an Orthodox Christian community out of guilt over the deaths of two young Cacophonists who reportedly died in a drunken post-event car accident (though one of the men eventually turned out to be completely fictitious, and the other, Peter "Mr. Outer Space" Geiberger, was discovered some months later, alive and well and quite amused at tumult resulting from his 'death'.  On September 13, 2006 Geiberger actually died, which proved somewhat anticlimactic in light of the elaborate mourning of his initial "passing.")  In spring 2001, Al Ridenour stepped down as leader of the chapter.
  
In 2005 Reverend Al resurfaced as Dr. A.P. Ridenour, leader of a safety consciousness organization, The Art of Bleeding, along with several members of the Orthodox faction of Los Angeles Cacophony.

In 2008, The Los Angeles Cacophony Society was revived by San Francisco Cacophonist Heathervescent and Rev. Borfo with Michael Mikel's Blessing. These events included Cacophony classics like the Brides of March and SantaCon as well as new events: Xmas in July, The Caveman Picnic, the LA Marathon Zombie Stop and zone trips to San Pedro's Sunken City, LAX-T, Salvation Mountain and beyond.

Seattle chapter
In December 1993, the Seattle Chapter held a protest event called "Uncan the Cranberries" at a shopping mall, where Cacophony members asked the public to "save the free-range cranberry".  Another Cacophony member asked the "adult children of parents" to avoid "disfunctionality and substance abuse" by staying home and avoiding family gatherings.

Portland chapter
By the mid-90s, Cacophony had spread to Portland, Oregon. In 1996, Portland Cacophony hosted the infamous first Naughty Santa rampage to take place outside of San Francisco.  The arrival of the planeload of Santas was met by Portland's police in riot gear, as someone in the SFPD had sent word ahead. Swift, thoughtful and very friendly action by Santa Melmoth, inviting the nice police along for the fun, kept confrontations to a minimum. The weekend resulted in only one arrest - involving a gift wrapped in a Playboy centerfold given to someone without checking the recipient's ID to make sure he was over 18.

For several years Portland Caco took responsibility for the Disgruntled Postal Workers - a group of surly, heavily armed people in postal uniforms who, when they felt like it, delivered newspapers and other forms of "mail" at the Burning Man annual festival, until the Burning Man organizers outlawed their guns (which, reportedly, made some of them even more disgruntled).  A kinder - gentler BRCPO (Black Rock City Post Office) which sends US postal mail from the Burning Man festival (with their own BRCPO postmark by special arrangement from the US Postmaster), is still run by PDX Cacophony associates.

Other favorite events include; Stripper Bingo, Goodwill Hunting, Brides of March, Rest Stop at the Shamrock Run,  Mondo Croquet, the Nuclear Family Picnic, the Ice Cream Anti-Social, Kindergarten Art in the Pearl, the Great Pumpkin Shoot, Spam Poetry Readings, Mutant Toy Workshops and SantaCon events throughout the year.

Costumed bar crawl events, notably Plunderathon, have been run with PDX Cacophony member support in association with Drunken Rampage, The Alter-Egos Society, and other groups.

Many individual members quietly conduct their own small D.I.Y. splinter missions, culture jams, zone trips, happenings, reverse shopping and "art projects" that do not require mass group participation or attract widespread attention.

Possibly the most widely known Cacophony member is novelist Chuck Palahniuk, who has mentioned his experiences with the Society in his writings, notably the book Fugitives and Refugees: A Walk in Portland, Oregon. He used the Cacophony Society as the basis for the fictional organization Project Mayhem in his novel Fight Club.  Palahniuk himself was pranked by a gang of Cacophonist waiters at one of his book readings in San Francisco.

Other chapters
Even as "official" Cacophony activity was dying down in San Francisco and Los Angeles, Caco chapters continued to spring up in other US cities and in other countries. Cacophony chapters are now or have been active in about two dozen American cities and in at least a half dozen other countries. In 2003 through 2006 and in 2008, "santarctica" was held at McMurdo Station, Antarctica.

Other events, affiliations
Many activities have been inspired by Cacophony and vice versa. Although in San Francisco the 'official' Cacophony label is presently not used often, Zombie attacks, Pee-wee Herman day (commemorating Paul Reubens' arrest in a pornographic theater) and other goofs are alive and well. The Santa rampages, which many believe have devolved into simple pub crawls, have been largely disassociated from Cacophony. Periodically, clowns, bunnies, zombies, whores and others have staged anti-Santa activities, to shake things up (sometimes called counter-culture jamming). Another example of counter-culture-jamming was Smiley Man, a neon prank installed secretly on the Man at Burning Man 1996, the last year that Cacophony founder John Law was Director of Operations at Burning Man, before control of the festival was taken over by a new corporation headed by one of the other founders, Larry Harvey. John Law had been responsible for the original neon on the Man, six years earlier.

Flash mob activities share some ideas with Cacophony, as well as groups like Improv Everywhere. The Society also has links to the Church of the SubGenius and the annual Saint Stupid's Day Parade held on April 1 in San Francisco, sponsored by Bishop Joey (AKA Ed Holmes) and to the Billboard Liberation Front a group of artist/pranksters responsible for many infamous billboard alterations. Urban explorers also have taken some inspiration from early Cacophony events such as the Sewer Walks.

References

External links
 The Cacophony Society's home web site
 PDX Cacophony Stumptown Lodge
 Zone Trip #4

 
Organizations based in San Francisco
American artist groups and collectives
Counterculture festivals activists
1986 establishments in California
Burning Man